Ibagué  (referred to as San Bonifacio de Ibagué del Valle de las Lanzas during the Spanish period) is the capital of Tolima, one of the 32 departments that make up the Republic of Colombia. The city is located in the center of the country, on the central mountain range of the Colombian Andes, near Nevado del Tolima. It is one of the most populous cities in the country, with about 529,635 (according to the 2018 census) inhabitants, making it the seventh (7th) most populous in Colombia. It was founded on October 14, 1550, by the Spanish captain Andrés López de Galarza. The city of Ibagué is divided into 13 communes and the rural area has 17 corregimientos. As the capital of the department of Tolima the city hosts the Government of Tolima, the Departmental Assembly, and the Attorney General's Office. It is the main epicenter of political, economic, administrative, business, art, culture, and tourism activities in the area.

Ibagué maintains one of the major urban economies of Colombia and could grow in prominence within South America with its development potential and competitive national and international business centers, industry, and infrastructure. It is one of three cities in the country chosen by the World Trade Center Association (WTCA) to build headquarters along with Cali, adding to the one existing in Bogotá. The economy of Ibagué is based primarily on the industrial, tourism, and agricultural sectors, with its textile industry being the third largest in Colombia. According to "Doing Business" from the World Bank in Washington DC, Ibagué tops the ranking of the cities with greater ease of doing business and investment in the country after Manizales. The city is also part of the Colombian coffee growing axis.

The city is known as "The Musical Capital of Colombia and America", thanks to the Conservatory of Tolima (one of the most prestigious and important in Colombia), folklore festivities, and its many monuments referring to music. The city's main educational institutions are the University of Tolima, the University of Ibagué, the Universidad Nacional Abierta y a Distancia (UNAD) and the Conservatory of Tolima.

History
The indigenous Pijaos commanded by cacique Ibagué were not fond of Spaniards colonizing the area so the city was re-founded in its current location on February 7, 1551. 

From April to December 1854, Ibagué was briefly the capital of the New Granada following a coup d'etat promoted by general José María Melo. In 1908, when the department of Tolima was created, Ibagué was designated as its capital. The University of Tolima was founded in 1945, and was raised to state university status in 1954. The city is also the home of the Roman Catholic Archdiocese of Ibagué.

Geography
Ibagué is located in the Colombian Andean region, in the center of the department of Tolima, surrounded by mountains on all sides with the exception of a plateau which extends to the east.

Volcanism
Ibagué lies within the Andean Volcanic Belt. The city is one access point to Los Nevados National Park, the other being Manizales.

Cerro Machín has been dormant for the last 800 years, but seismological activity has been registered recently causing several earthquakes. The volcano is classified as "III – Changes in behavior of volcanic activity" by Ingeominas, the Colombian Institute for Geology and Mining. A map of menaced areas has been published indicating that in the event of an eruption the city of Ibagué would not be affected despite its proximity to the volcano.

Demographics

The total population of the municipality of Ibagué (including urban and rural areas), according to the 2018 census, was 529,635 inhabitants, of which 492,554 resided in the urban area.

Infrastructure

Transportation
Municipal transport is managed by several local bus companies that operate minibuses throughout the city and to neighboring villages.

Ibagué lies at the intersection of national roads 40 and 43, connecting the city to Magdalena River Valley and Bogotá to the east, Armenia and the Valle del Cauca to the west, and Honda to the north. There is a long distance bus terminal with connections to most big cities in Colombia. There are frequent connections to Bogotá, Cali, Medellín, and several overnight buses to Cartagena, Barranquilla, and seasonal services to Santa Marta.

Climate
Ibagué features a tropical rainforest climate under the Köppen climate classification, albeit a relatively cooler version of the climate due to the high altitude. On average Ibagué sees  of rain annually.

Neighborhoods
 

Licapeña

Notable people
Andres Marin, competitive ice climber
Darío Ortiz Robledo, artist
Óscar Escandón, boxer
Jairo Alberto Bocanegra Pena, singer
Patricia Caicedo, soprano
Estefanía Gómez, actress
James Cañón, novelist
James Rodríguez, soccer player

Sports

The Colombian Football Association announced that Ibagué will be one of the venue cities to host the 2016 FIFA Futsal World Cup, although in the end it was not designated as the venue for the sporting event.

Twin towns – sister cities

Ibagué is twinned with:
 Chengdu, China
 Vitoria-Gasteiz, Spain

References

External links
 El Nuevo Día (local journal)
 ElOlfato.com (digital magazine)
 Ecos del Combeima (local radio station and digital radio)
 Ondas de Ibagué (local radio station and digital radio)
 
 

Municipalities of Tolima Department
Capitals of Colombian departments